Martha Albrand (1914–1981), born Heidi Huberta Freybe Loewengard was a German-American novelist.  Albrand was the name of her Danish great-grandfather.

She was the sister of the actress Jutta Freybe and the writer Johanna Sibelius.

The film Captain Carey, U.S.A. was based on her novel After Midnight.

Bibliography

Novels written as Katrin Holland
 Man spricht über Jacqueline, 1926
 Wie macht man das nur ???, 1930
 Unterwegs zu Alexander: Ein Liebesroman, 1932
 Die silberne Wolke: Ein Roman aus unserer Zeit, 1933
 Babett auf Gottes Gnaden, 1934
 Das Mädchen, das niemand mochte, 1935
 Das Frauenhaus, 1935
 Carlotta Torresani, 1938
 Einsamer Himmel, 1938
 Vierzehn Tage mit Edita, 1939
 Helene, 1940
 The Obsession of Emmet Booth, 1957

Novels written as Martha Albrand
 No Surrender, 1942
 Without Orders, 1943
 Endure No Longer, 1944
 None Shall Know, 1945
 Remembered Anger, 1946
 Whispering Hill, 1947
 After Midnight, 1948
 Wait for the Dawn, 1950
 Desperate Moment, 1951
 The Hunted Woman, 1953
 Nightmare in Copenhagen, 1954
 The Mask of Alexander, 1955
 The Story That Could Not Be Told, 1956 (alternative title The Linden)
 A Day in Monte Carlo, 1959
 Meet Me Tonight, 1960 (alternative title Return to Terror)
 A Call from Austria, 1963
 The Door fell Shut, 1966
 Rhine Replica, 1969
 Manhattan North, 1971
 Zurich/AZ 900, 1974
 A Taste of Terror, 1976
 Intermission, 1978 (alternative title Final Encore)

Novels written as Christine Lambert
 The Ball, 1961
 A Sudden Woman, 1964

Filmography
 Die Nacht der großen Liebe (Germany, 1933)
 Talking About Jacqueline (Germany, 1937, based on Man spricht über Jacqueline)
 Talk About Jacqueline (UK, 1942, based on Man spricht über Jacqueline)
 Captain Carey, U.S.A. (1950, based on After Midnight)
 Desperate Moment (UK, 1953, based on Desperate Moment)

References

1914 births
1981 deaths
20th-century American novelists
American women novelists
German emigrants to the United States
People from the Grand Duchy of Mecklenburg-Schwerin
20th-century American women writers
People from Rostock
American people of Danish descent
People who emigrated to escape Nazism